In chess, a passed pawn is a pawn with no opposing pawns to prevent it from advancing to the eighth ; i.e. there are no opposing pawns in front of it on either the same  or adjacent files.  A passed pawn is sometimes colloquially called a passer.  Passed pawns are advantageous because only the opponent's pieces can stop them from promoting.

In the diagram, the white pawns on b5, c4, and e5 are passed pawns, and Black's pawn on d4 is a passed pawn.  If Black plays ...fxg4, then the black pawn on g4 will be passed, as well as White's pawn on f4.

Protected passed pawn

A passed pawn that is protected by its own pawns is called a protected passed pawn. In the first diagram in this article, the pawns on the b- and e-files are protected passed pawns. Two or more passed pawns on adjacent files are called connected passed pawns (see connected pawns), and they are very strong. In the diagram at the top, White's b- and c-pawns are connected passed pawns. A pair of connected passed pawns is sometimes called a steamroller.

Sometimes, minor pieces are sacrificed so that a pawn can have a clear path to promotion on the eighth rank.  In the example illustrated (Mikhail Botvinnik–José Capablanca, AVRO 1938), in order to capitalize on the passed pawn on e6 and break its blockade by Black's queen, White continued 30. Ba3 Qxa3 31. Nh5+! gxh5 32. Qg5+ Kf8 33. Qxf6+ guaranteeing the e-pawn's promotion.  The passed pawn's value is well worth the sacrifice of the bishop in order to clear its path to promotion. The only pieces preventing the e-pawn's promotion are the black queen and knight, and once they are gone, the pawn has a free path to promote. Black's pawns are also helpless to stop it.

Outside passed pawn

An outside passed pawn is a passed pawn that is separated by several files from the rest of the pawns and deflects the opposing king (and sometimes other pieces) from the defense of its other pawns. Such a pawn often constitutes a strong advantage for its owner because the opposing king does not have the range to cover both sides of the board.

In the diagrammed position from the fifth game of the 1971 Candidates match between Bobby Fischer and Bent Larsen, the outside passed pawn on the a-file confers White a winning advantage, even though  is equal.  The pawn will force Black's king to keep it from queening, leaving White's king free to capture Black's remaining pawns and win the game. White wins with:
41. Kd4 Kd6 
42. a5 f6
43. a6 Kc6  
44. a7 Kb7 
45. Kd5 h4 
If 45...f5 46.h4 wins.
46. Ke6 1–0

It is not so powerful in an endgame with rooks if the opposing rook can get behind the pawn (see diagram), as in the Tarrasch rule.

Passed pawns in the endgame

Passed pawns are particularly important, often of decisive significance, in the endgame. The position illustrated provides a dramatic example of this. White has no passed pawns and seems to be in desperate straits, since Black's king will soon attack White's pawns with ...Kg4. In fact, White by means of a sacrificial combination creates a passed pawn and wins: 1. g6 fxg6 (or 1...hxg6 2.f6! gxf6 3.h6!) 2. h6! gxh6 3. f6! and White's newly created passed pawn will queen. If it is Black's move, he must avoid this combination by playing 1... g6! (not 1...f6 2.h6!, nor 1...h6 2.f6!).

Since passed pawns have no opposing pawns to stop them, the threat of queening often forces the opponent to use a piece to block or capture the pawn, wasting valuable time and immobilizing material or possibly even losing it (as when a defender of the blocking piece is forced to move).  Indeed, the value of a far-advanced passed pawn or pawn group is often equal to or even greater than that of a piece. Four examples of this are seen in the subdivided diagram.  In the upper-left quadrant of the board, White's connected passed pawns on the sixth rank are superior to Black's rook. Even if on move, Black cannot stop one of White's pawns from queening. Similarly, in the upper-right quadrant, Black's bishop cannot hold back both of White's pawns. White queens a pawn after 1. f7 (1.h7 also works) Bxf7 2. h7 followed by 3. h8=Q. In the lower-left quadrant, White's queen cannot stop Black's pawn from queening without stalemating Black. The lower-right quadrant highlights how awkward a knight is in dealing with a passed pawn, especially a rook pawn. White's knight is actually worse than useless in trying to stop Black's pawn. It cannot do so itself, and if White's king (which could catch the pawn if the knight were not there) approaches with 1. Kf2 (hoping for 1...hxg2 2.Kxg2), Black plays 1... h2! and 2... h1=Q.

A striking (albeit very unusual) example of the power of passed pawns is seen in the conclusion of an endgame study by Leopold Mitrofanov (see diagram). Black, with a queen, bishop, and knight, is helpless against White's two passed pawns, which threaten both 10.b7 and 10.c8=Q+ Bb8 11.b7#.

Quotes
 "A passed pawn is a criminal which should be kept under lock and key. Mild measures, such as police surveillance, are not sufficient." — Aron Nimzowitsch

See also

 Backward pawn
 Chess endgame
 Chess piece
 Chess strategy
 Connected pawns
 Doubled pawns
 Isolated pawn
 List of chess terms
 Pawn structure
 Tarrasch rule

References

Bibliography
 
 
 
 

Chess terminology

it:Termini scacchistici#Pedone passato